This is a list of butterflies of Papua New Guinea. This list includes species recorded from mainland Papua New Guinea, but also all islands that are part of the country, such as the Trobriand Islands, the D'Entrecasteaux Islands, the Louisiade Archipelago and the Bismarck Archipelago.

Hesperiidae

Pyrginae
Chaetocneme antipodes antipodes (Guérin-Méneville, 1831)
Chaetocneme antipodes biaka (Joicey & Talbot, 1916)
Chaetocneme caristus Hewitson, 1867
Chaetocneme critomedia (Guérin-Méneville, 1831)
Chaetocneme editus (Plötz, 1885)
Chaetocneme helirius (Cramer, 1775)
Chaetocneme lunula (Mabille, 1888)
Chaetocneme morea Evans, 1934
Chaetocneme naevifera dissimilis (Swinhoe, 1905)
Chaetocneme sombra (Evans, 1934)
Chaetocneme tenuis hibernia (Evans, 1934)
Chaetocneme tenuis tenuis (Eecke, 1924)
Chaetocneme trifenestrata (Fruhstorfer, 1910)
Chaetocneme triton (Boisduval, 1832)
Netrocoryne thaddeus (Hewitson, 1876)
Tagiades japetus hovia (Swinhoe, 1904)
Tagiades japetus inconspicua (Rothschild, 1915)
Tagiades japetus janetta (Butler, 1870)
Tagiades japetus mathias Evans, 1934
Tagiades nestus brunta Evans, 1949
Tagiades nestus korela (Mabille, 1891)
Tagiades nestus presbyter (Butler, 1882)
Tagiades nestus suffusus (Rothschild, 1915)
Tagiades trebellius canonicus Fruhstorfer, 1910
Tagiades trebellius lola Evans, 1949
Tagiades trebellius vella (Evans, 1934)

Coeliadinae
Allora doleschallii albertisi (Oberthür, 1880)
Allora major lectra Evans, 1949
Allora major major (Rothschild, 1916)
Allora major talesia Evans, 1949
Badamia exclamationis (Fabricius, 1775)
Choaspes hemixanthus hemixanthus Rothschild, 1903
Choaspes illuensis ornatus Rothschild, 1903
Hasora buina Evans, 1928
Hasora celaenus (Stoll, 1782)
Hasora chromus bilunata (Butler, 1883)
Hasora chromus chromus (Cramer, 1782)
Hasora discolor eira Evans, 1949
Hasora discolor mastusia Fruhstorfer, 1911
Hasora hurama hurama (Butler, 1870)
Hasora hurama kieta (Strand, 1921)
Hasora khoda dampierensis Rothschild, 1915
Hasora khoda linda Evans, 1934
Hasora lavella Evans, 1928
Hasora proxissima takwa Evans, 1949
Hasora subcaelestis Rothschild, 1916
Hasora taminatus dipama Fruhstorfer, 1911
Hasora thridas chalybeata Joicey & Talbot, 1917
Hasora thridas thridas (Boisduval, 1832)
Hasora vitta simillima Rothschild, 1916

Trapezitinae
Felicena dirpha albicilla (Joicey & Talbot, 1917)
Felicena dirpha dirpha (Boisduval, 1832)
Felicena dirpha nota Evans, 1949
Felicena dora Evans, 1949
Hewitsoniella migonitis (Hewitson, 1876)
Rachelia extrusa (C. & R. Felder, 1867)
Rachelia icosia (Fruhstorfer, 1911)
Toxidia arfakensis (Joicey & Talbot, 1917)
Toxidia inornata sekara (Plötz, 1885)

Hesperiinae
Arrhenes dschilus decor (Evans, 1934)
Arrhenes dschilus dschilus (Plötz, 1885)
Arrhenes elena Evans, 1934
Arrhenes germana (Rothschild, 1916)
Arrhenes marnas (C Felder, 1860)
Arrhenes martha Evans, 1934
Arrhenes tranquilla (Rothschild, 1916)
Borbo cinnara (Wallace & Moore, 1866)
Borbo impar tetragraphus (Mabille, 1891)
Caltoris boisduvalii hilda (Evans, 1937)
Caltoris philippina subfenestrata (Röber, 1891)
Cephrenes augiades bruno Evans, 1935
Cephrenes augiades meeki Evans, 1935
Cephrenes augiades websteri Evans, 1935
Cephrenes augusta Evans, 1934
Cephrenes moseleyi (Butler, 1884)
Cephrenes shortlandica (Swinhoe, 1915)
Cephrenes trichopepla trichopepla (Lower, 1908)
Erionota thrax (Linnaeus, 1767)
Kobrona eva Evans, 1935
Kobrona idea Evans, 1949
Kobrona infralutea (Rothschild, 1916)
Kobrona kobros kobros (Plötz, 1885)
Kobrona pansa pansa Evans, 1934
Kobrona rasta Evans, 1935
Kobrona wama rudha (Fruhstorfer, 1911)
Mimene albiclavata (Butler, 1882)
Mimene atropatene (Fruhstorfer, 1911)
Mimene basalis basalis (Rothschild, 1916)
Mimene biakensis biakensis Joicey & Talbot, 1917
Mimene caesar Evans, 1935
Mimene celia Evans, 1935
Mimene celiaba Parsons, 1986
Mimene cyanea (Evans, 1928)
Mimene kolbei kolbei (Ribbe, 1899)
Mimene kolbei tenebricosa (Mabille, 1904)
Mimene lysima (Swinhoe, 1905)
Mimene melie (de Nicéville, 1895)
Mimene milnea Evans, 1935
Mimene miltias (Kirsch, 1877)
Mimene orida (Boisduval, 1832)
Mimene waigeuensis Joicey & Talbot, 1917
Mimene wandammenensis Joicey & Talbot, 1917
Notocrypta aluensis Swinhoe, 1907
Notocrypta caerulea Evans, 1928
Notocrypta flavipes (Janson, 1886)
Notocrypta maria Evans, 1949
Notocrypta renardi (Oberthür, 1880)
Notocrypta waigensis waigensis (Plötz, 1882)
Ocybadistes ardea Bethune-Baker, 1906
Ocybadistes flavovittata flavovittata (Latreille, 1824)
Ocybadistes flavovittata kokoda Evans, 1949
Ocybadistes walkeri walkeri Heron, 1894
Pastria albimedia (Joicey & Talbot, 1917)
Pelopidas agna agnata Evans, 1937
Pelopidas agna dingo Evans, 1949
Pelopidas lyelli lyelli (Rothschild, 1915)
Pelopidas mathias repetita (Butler, 1882)
Potanthus taxilus ahrendti (Plötz, 1883)
Potanthus fettingi ahrendti (Plötz, 1883)
Sabera aruana aruana (Plötz, 1886)
Sabera biaga Evans, 1949
Sabera caesina barina Fruhstorfer, 1910
Sabera caesina louisa Evans, 1935
Sabera caesina sudesta Evans, 1935
Sabera dobboe dobboe (Plötz, 1885)
Sabera dobboe hanova Evans, 1949
Sabera dorena Evans, 1935
Sabera expansa Evans, 1935
Sabera fuliginosa chota Evans, 1949
Sabera fusca Joicey & Talbot, 1917
Sabera kumpia kumpia Evans, 1949
Sabera misola Evans, 1949
Sabera tabla (Swinhoe, 1905)
Suniana sunias isabella Evans, 1934
Suniana sunias nihana (Fruhstorfer, 1910)
Suniana sunias tanus (Plötz, 1885)
Taractrocera dolon (Plötz, 1884)
Telicota angiana Evans, 1934
Telicota argeus argeus (Plötz, 1883)
Telicota argeus zara (Evans, 1949)
Telicota brachydesma Lower, 1908
Telicota colon vega Evans, 1949
Telicota elsa Evans, 1934
Telicota eurotas eurotas (Felder, 1860)
Telicota gervasa Evans, 1949
Telicota ixion (Evans, 1949)
Telicota kaimana Evans, 1934
Telicota kezia kezia Evans, 1949
Telicota kezia lenna Evans, 1949
Telicota melanion melanion (Mabille, 1878)
Telicota paceka affinis Rothschild, 1916
Telicota paceka cadmus (Evans, 1934)
Telicota paceka paceka Fruhstorfer, 1911
Telicota sadra Evans, 1949
Telicota sadrella Parsons, 1986
Telicota solva (Evans, 1949)
Telicota subha (Fruhstorfer, 1911)
Telicota ternatensis moorei Rothschild, 1916
Telicota vinta Evans, 1949

Papilionidae

Papilioninae
Chilasa moerneri mayrhoferi (Bang-Haas, 1939)
Chilasa moerneri moerneri (Aurivillius, 1919)
Chilasa toboroi toboroi (Ribbe, 1907)
Cressida cressida troilus (Butler, 1876)
Graphium agamemnon admiralis (Rothschild, 1915)
Graphium agamemnon ligatus Rothschild, 1895
Graphium agamemnon neopommerania (Honrath, 1887)
Graphium agamemnon salomonis Rothschild, 1895
Graphium aristeus parmatus (Gray, 1852)
Graphium aristeus paron (Godman & Salvin, 1879)
Graphium browni (Godman & Salvin, 1879)
Graphium codrus auratus (Rothschild, 1898)
Graphium codrus gabriellae Racheli, 1979
Graphium codrus medon (C & R Felder, 1864)
Graphium codrus schoutensis Talbot & Joicey, 1916
Graphium codrus segonax (Godman & Salvin, 1878)
Graphium eurypylus extensus (Rothschild, 1895)
Graphium felixi (Joicey & Noakes, 1915)
Graphium eurypylus lycaonides (Rothschild, 1895)
Graphium hicetaon (Mathew, 1886)
Graphium kosii Muller & Tennent, 1999
Graphium macfarlanei admiralia (Rothschild, 1915)
Graphium macfarlanei macfarlanei (Butler, 1877)
Graphium macfarlanei seminigra (Butler, 1882)
Graphium meeki inexpectatum Miller & Miller, 1981
Graphium sarpedon choredon (C & R Felder, 1864)
Graphium sarpedon imparilis (Rothschild, 1895)
Graphium sarpedon isander (Godman & Salvin, 1888)
Graphium sarpedon messogis (Fruhstorfer, 1907)
Graphium thule (Wallace, 1865)
Graphium wallacei wallacei (Hewitson, 1858)
Graphium weiskei goodenovii (Rothschild, 1915)
Graphium weiskei weiskei (Ribbe, 1900)
Ornithoptera chimaera charybdis van Eecke, 1915
Ornithoptera chimaera chimaera (Rothschild, 1902)
Ornithoptera chimaera draco Rousseau-Decelle, 1935
Ornithoptera goliath atlas Rothschild, 1908
Ornithoptera goliath goliath (Oberthür, 1888)
Ornithoptera goliath samson Niepelt, 1913
Ornithoptera goliath supremus Röber, 1896
Ornithoptera meridionalis tarunggarensis Joicey & Talbot, 1927
Ornithoptera paradisea arfakensis Joicey & Talbot, 1915
Ornithoptera paradisea chrysanthemum Kobayashi et al.,1986
Ornithoptera paradisea demeter So & Sato, 1998
Ornithoptera paradisea flavescens Rothschild, 1897
Ornithoptera paradisea paradisea (Staudinger, 1893)
Ornithoptera priamus admiralitatis (Rothschild, 1915)
Ornithoptera priamus aureus Parrot, 1988
Ornithoptera priamus boisduvalii (Montrouzier, 1856)
Ornithoptera priamus bornemanni (Pagenstecher, 1894)
Ornithoptera priamus caelestis (Rothschild, 1898)
Ornithoptera priamus miokensis (Ribbe, 1898)
Ornithoptera priamus poseidon (Doubleday, 1847)
Ornithoptera priamus sterrensis Parrot, 1990
Ornithoptera priamus teucrus Joicey & Talbot, 1916
Ornithoptera priamus urvillianus (Guérin-Méneville, 1838)
Ornithoptera priamus wituensis D'Abrera, 2003
Ornithoptera rothschildi (Kenrick, 1911)
Ornithoptera tithonus cytherea Kobayashi et al.,1986
Ornithoptera tithonus dominici Schäffler, 1999
Ornithoptera tithonus tithonus (De Haan, 1841)
Ornithoptera tithonus waigeuensis Rothschild, 1897
Ornithoptera victoriae regis (Rothschild, 1895)
Pachliopta polydorus aignanus (Rothschild, 1898)
Pachliopta polydorus aphnitis (Fruhstorfer, 1913)
Pachliopta polydorus asinius (Fruhstorfer, 1904)
Pachliopta polydorus auster (van Eecke,1915)
Pachliopta polydorus ceramites (Fruhstorfer, 1915)
Pachliopta polydorus godartianus (Lucas, 1852)
Pachliopta polydorus humboldti (Rothschild, 1908)
Pachliopta polydorus leodamas (Wallace, 1865)
Pachliopta polydorus mamberanus (Toxopeus, 1950)
Pachliopta polydorus manus (Talbot, 1932)
Pachliopta polydorus meforanus (Rothschild, 1908)
Pachliopta polydorus naissus (Fruhstorfer, 1908)
Pachliopta polydorus novobritannicus (Rothschild, 1895)
Pachliopta polydorus polypemon (Mathew, 1887)
Pachliopta polydorus schoutensis (Joicey & Talbot, 1924)
Pachliopta polydorus wangaarensis (Joicey & Talbot, 1924)
Papilio aegeus aegatinus Rothschild, 1908
Papilio aegeus oritas (Godman & Salvin, 1879)
Papilio aegeus ormenus (Guérin-Méneville, 1831)
Papilio aegeus othello Grose-Smith, 1894
Papilio aegeus websteri (Grose-Smith, 1894)
Papilio albinus albinus Wallace, 1865
Papilio ambrax ambrax Boisduval, 1832
Papilio ambrax artanus Rothschild, 1908
Papilio ambrax dunali (Montrouzier, 1856)
Papilio bridgei bridgei Mathew, 1886
Papilio cartereti (Oberthür, 1914)
Papilio deiphobus aristartus Fruhstorfer, 1916
Papilio deiphobus deipylus C.& R.Felder, 1864
Papilio deiphobus efbensis Talbot, 1932
Papilio demoleus demoleus Linnaeus, 1758
Papilio demoleus novoguineensis Rothschild, 1908
Papilio euchenor comma Joicey & Noakes, 1915
Papilio euchenor depilis Rothschild, 1895
Papilio euchenor euchenor Guérin-Méneville, 1830
Papilio euchenor eutropius Janson, 1886
Papilio euchenor godartii (Montrouzier, 1856)
Papilio euchenor misimanus Rothschild, 1898
Papilio euchenor misolensis Rothschild, 1908
Papilio euchenor neohannoveranus Rothschild, 1898
Papilio euchenor novohibernicus Rothschild, 1896
Papilio euchenor rosselanus Rothschild, 1908
Papilio euchenor sudestensis Rothschild, 1908
Papilio fuscus beccarii Oberthür, 1880
Papilio fuscus cilix (Godman & Salvin, 1879)
Papilio fuscus hasterti (Ribbe, 1907)
Papilio fuscus indicatus (Butler, 1876)
Papilio fuscus lamponius (Fruhstorfer, 1904)
Papilio fuscus offakus Fruhstorfer, 1904
Papilio laglaizei laglaizei Depuiset, 1877
Papilio lorquinianus albertisi Oberthür, 1880
Papilio lorquinianus apollodorus Fruhstorfer, 1909
Papilio lorquinianus dewaro Joicey & Talbot, 1922
Papilio lorquinianus ochoco Shimogori,1997
Papilio phestus minusculus (Ribbe, 1898)
Papilio phestus parkinsoni (Honrath, 1886)
Papilio phestus phestus Guérin-Méneville, 1831
Papilio phestus reductus Rothschild, 1915
Papilio ulysses ambiguus Rothschild, 1895
Papilio ulysses autolycus C.& R.Felder, 1865
Papilio ulysses dirce Jordan, 1909
Papilio ulysses denticulatus Joicey & Talbot, 1916
Papilio ulysses gabrielis Rothschild, 1898
Papilio ulysses orsippus (Godman & Salvin, 1888)
Papilio ulysses telemachus (Montrouzier, 1856)
Papilio woodfordi woodfordi Godman & Salvin, 1888
Troides oblongomaculatus oblongomaculatus (Goeze, 1779)
Troides oblongomaculatus papuensis (Wallace, 1865)

Pieridae

Coliadinae
Catopsilia pomona (Fabricius, 1775)
Catopsilia scylla etesia (Hewitson, 1867)
Catopsilia pyranthe (Linnaeus, 1758)
Eurema alitha novaguineensis Shirozu & Yata, 1982
Eurema blanda saraha (Fruhstorfer, 1912)
Eurema brigitta sincera Shirôzu & Yata, 1982
Eurema candida salomonis (Butler, 1898)
Eurema candida xanthomelaena (Godman & Salvin, 1879)
Eurema hecabe kerawara Ribbe, 1898
Eurema hecabe nivaria (Fruhstorfer, 1910)
Eurema hecabe oeta (Fruhstorfer, 1910)
Eurema puella brandti Tennent, 2004
Eurema puella diotima (Fruhstorfer, 1910)
Eurema puella misima Tennent, 2004
Gandaca butyrosa aiguina Fruhstorfer, 1910

Pierinae
Appias ada florentia Grose-Smith, 1896
Appias ada thasia (Fruhstorfer, 1901)
Appias albina albina (Boisduval, 1836)
Appias celestina celestina (Boisduval, 1832)
Appias celestina eumilis (Boisduval, 1832)
Appias celestina orientalis (Rothschild, 1915)
Appias leis saina Grose-Smith, 1894
Appias paulina albina (Boisduval, 1836)
Belenois java peristhene (Boisduval, 1859)
Belenois java picata (Butler, 1882)
Belenois java teutonia (Fabricius, 1775)
Cepora abnormis (Wallace, 1867)
Cepora aspasia (Stoll, 1790)
Cepora perimale agnata (Grose-Smith, 1889)
Cepora perimale dohertyana (Grose-Smith, 1894)
Cepora perimale latilimbata (Butler, 1876)
Cepora perimale leucophora (Grose-Smith, 1897)
Cepora perimale quadricolor (Salvin & Godman, 1877)
Cepora perimale wallaceana (C. & R. Felder, 1865)
Delias abrophora abrophora Roepke, 1955
Delias abrophora bugebu Van Mastrigt, 1996
Delias abrophora okbibab Van Mastrigt, 1996
Delias alberti guava Arora, 1983
Delias albertisi albertisi (Oberthür, 1880)
Delias albertisi albiplaga Joicey & Talbot, 1922
Delias albertisi putih Van Mastrigt, 1996
Delias albertisi tamamitsui Morita, 1996
Delias alepa alepa Jordan, [1912]
Delias alepa kunupiensis Joicey & Talbot, 1922
Delias alepa orthobasis Roepke, 1955
Delias angiensis Talbot, 1928
Delias antara antara Roepke, 1955
Delias antara solana Morinaka & Nakazawa, 1997
Delias arabuana arabuana Roepke, 1955
Delias arabuana asawaorum Morita, 1996
Delias arabuana modioensis Van Mastrigt, [1988]
Delias arfakensis Joicey & Talbot, 1922
Delias argentata argentata Roepke, 1955
Delias argentata clutus Yagishita, 1993
Delias argenthona balli Hulstaert, 1923
Delias aroae aroae Ribbe, 1901
Delias aroae yabensis Joicey & Talbot, 1922
Delias aruna aruna (Boisduval, 1832)
Delias aruna inferna Butler, 1871
Delias aruna rona Rothschild, 1898
Delias autumnalis autumnalis Roepke, 1955
Delias autumnalis hiberna Van Mastrigt, 2000
Delias autumnalis michiae Nakano, 1994
Delias awongkor awongkor Van Mastrigt, [1988]
Delias bagoe bagoe (Boisduval, 1832)
Delias bagoe restricta Rothschild, 1915
Delias bakeri Kenrick, 1909
Delias biaka Joicey & Noakes, 1915
Delias bobaga bobaga Van Mastrigt, 1990
Delias bobaga homeyo Van Mastrigt, 1996
Delias bosnikiana Joicey & Noakes, 1915
Delias bothwelli Kenrick, 1909
Delias brandti Muller, 2001
Delias caliban caliban Grose-Smith, 1897
Delias caliban satisbona Rothschild, 1915
Delias callista callipareia Roepke, 1955
Delias callista callista Jordan, [1912]
Delias callista callipulchra Gerrits & Van Mastrigt, [1993]
Delias callista miyashitai Yagishita, 1993
Delias campbelli campbelli Joicey & Talbot, 1922
Delias campbelli microleuca Roepke, 1955
Delias caroli caroli Kenrick, 1909
Delias caroli wandammenensae Joicey & Talbot, 1916
Delias carstensziana carstensziana Rothschild, 1915
Delias carstensziana starensis Lachlan, 2000
Delias castaneus Kenrick, 1909
Delias catisa aurostriga Roepke, 1955
Delias catisa catisa Jordan, [1912]
Delias catisa morinakai Yagishita, 1993
Delias catisa sumbole Van Mastrigt, 2001
Delias catisa wisseliana Roepke, 1955
Delias catocausta catocausta Jordan, [1912]
Delias catocausta eefi Van Mastrigt, 1990
Delias cumanau Van Mastrigt, 2006
Delias cyclosticha Roepke, 1955
Delias daniensis Van Mastrigt, 2003
Delias destrigata Van Mastrigt, 1996
Delias dice dice (Vollenhoven, 1865)
Delias dice fulvoflava Rothschild, 1915
Delias dice latimarginata Joicey & Talbot, 1922
Delias dice latoclavata Van Eecke, 1924
Delias dice mitisana Strand, 1916
Delias dice rectifascia Talbot, 1928
Delias dice samarai Joicey & Talbot, 1916
Delias discus apodiscus Roepke, 1955
Delias discus discoides Talbot, 1937
Delias discus discus Honrath, 1886
Delias discus larseni Lück& Gehlen, 1911
Delias dixeyi Kenrick, 1909
Delias dohertyi dohertyi Oberthür, 1894
Delias dohertyi knowlei Joicey & Noakes, 1915
Delias dortheysi Van Mastrigt, 2002
Delias durai Van Mastrigt, 2006
Delias elongatus Kenrick, 1911
Delias ennia ennia Wallace, 1867
Delias ennia iere Grose-Smith, 1900
Delias ennia jobiana (Oberthür, 1894)
Delias ennia limbata Rothschild, 1915
Delias ennia multicolor Joicey & Noakes, 1915
Delias ennia mysolensis Rothschild, 1915
Delias ennia oetakwensis Rothschild, 1915
Delias ennia saturata Rothschild, 1915
Delias enniana contracta Talbot, 1928
Delias enniana enniana (Oberthür, 1880)
Delias enniana hidehitoi Morita, 2003
Delias enniana kapaura Rothschild, 1915
Delias enniana majoripuncta Joicey & Talbot, 1922
Delias enniana obsoleta Rothschild, 1915
Delias enniana reducta Rothschild, 1915
Delias euphemia Grose-Smith, 1894
Delias eximia Rothschild, 1915
Delias fascelis amungme Van Mastrigt, 1996
Delias fascelis citrona Joicey & Talbot, 1922
Delias fascelis fascelis Jordan, [1912]
Delias fascelis ibelana Roepke, 1955
Delias fascelis korupun Van Mastrigt, 1996
Delias fascelis paniaia Schmitt, 1992
Delias fioretti Van Mastrigt, 1996
Delias flavistriga flavistriga Roepke, 1955
Delias flavistriga ilagaensis Van Mastrigt, [1988]
Delias fojaensis Van Mastrigt, 2006
Delias frater far Schröder& Treadaway, 1982
Delias frater frater Jordan, [1912]
Delias frater soror Toxopeus, 1944
Delias gabia aurantimacula Joicey & Talbot, 1922
Delias gabia callistrate (Grose-Smith, 1897)
Delias gabia felsina Fruhstorfer, 1910
Delias gabia gabia (Boisduval, 1832)
Delias gabia marinda Hulstaert, 1924
Delias gabia zarate Grose-Smith, 1900
Delias geraldina masakoae Nakano, 1998
Delias geraldina onin Yagishita, 2003
Delias geraldina siderea Roepke, 1955
Delias geraldina vaneechoudi Roepke, 1955
Delias geraldina vogelcopensis Yagishita, 1993
Delias germana Roepke, 1955
Delias hapalina adnexa Roepke, 1955
Delias hapalina amoena Roepke, 1955
Delias hapalina hapalina Jordan, [1912]
Delias hapalina kaloni Gotts & Ginn, 2004
Delias heliophora Roepke, 1955
Delias hemianops Gerrits & Van Mastrigt, [1993]
Delias heroni Kenrick, 1909
Delias hiemalis flabella Van Mastrigt, 1996
Delias hiemalis hiemalis Roepke, 1955
Delias hiemalis labbei Van Mastrigt, 2000
Delias hiemalis nemangkawi Van Mastrigt, 2000
Delias hikarui Yagishita, 1993
Delias hypomelas conversa Jordan, [1912]
Delias hypomelas fulgida Roepke, 1955
Delias hypomelas lieftincki Roepke, 1955
Delias hypomelas rubrostriata Joicey& Talbot, 1922
Delias hypoxantha Roepke, 1955
Delias iltis sibil Van Mastrigt, 1996
Delias imitator Kenrick, 1911
Delias inexpectata Rothschild, 1915
Delias inopinata orri Van Mastrigt, 2003
Delias isocharis latiapicalis Joicey & Talbot, 1922
Delias jordani Kenrick, 1909
Delias kenricki Talbot, 1937
Delias klossi chrysanthemum Roepke, 1955
Delias klossi gome Van Mastrigt, 2000
Delias klossi klossi Rothschild, 1915
Delias kristianiae Van Mastrigt, 2006
Delias kummeri athena Yagishita, 2003
Delias kummeri chiekoae Nakano, 1995
Delias kummeri fumosa Roepke, 1955
Delias kummeri highlandensis Yagishita, 1993
Delias kummeri rouffaer Yagishita, 1993
Delias kummeri similis Talbot, 1928
Delias ladas fakfakensis Yagishita, 2003
Delias ladas ladas Smith, 1894
Delias ladas levis Joicey & Talbot, 1922
Delias ladas waigeuensis Joicey & Talbot, 1917
Delias ladas wamenaensis Morita, 1993
Delias ladas yapenensis Yagishita, 1998
Delias langda langda Gerrits & Van Mastrigt, [1993]
Delias langda watlangku Gerrits & Van Mastrigt, [1993]
Delias lara lara (Boisduval, 1836)
Delias lecerfi Joicey & Talbot, 1922
Delias leucias leucias Jordan, [1912]
Delias leucias torini Gotts & Ginn, 2004
Delias leucobalia distincta Rothschild, 1915
Delias leucobalia ericetorum Roepke, 1955
Delias ligata dealbata Talbot, 1928
Delias ligata interpolata Roepke, 1955
Delias ligata weylandensis Joicey & Talbot, 1922
Delias luctuosa archboldi Roepke, 1955
Delias luctuosa gottsi Gerrits & Van Mastrigt, [1993]
Delias luctuosa magoda Gerrits & Yagishita, 2000
Delias lytaea lytaea (Godman & Salvin, 1878)
Delias madetes honrathi (von Mitis, 1893)
Delias madetes madetes (Godman & Salvin, 1878)
Delias madetes neohannoverana Rothschild, 1915
Delias marguerita Joicey & Talbot, 1922
Delias mariae Joicey & Talbot, 1916
Delias maudei Joicey & Noakes, 1915
Delias mavroneria flavidior Rothschild, 1915
Delias mavroneria mavroneria Fruhstorfer, 1914
Delias menooensis boschmai Roepke, 1955
Delias menooensis menooensis Joicey & Talbot, 1922
Delias mesoblema Jordan, [1912]
Delias messalina lizzae Muller, 1999
Delias messalina messalina Arora, 1983
Delias messalina vigasa Parsons, 1989
Delias microsticha flavopicta Jordan, [1912]
Delias microsticha microsticha Rothschild, 1904
Delias microsticha serratula Toxopeus, 1955
Delias microsticha weja Van Mastrigt, 2006
Delias muliensis Morinaka, Van Mastrigt & Sinabati, 1991
Delias mysis goodenovii Rothschild, 1915
Delias mysis maga (Grose-Smith, 1897)
Delias mysis nemea Fruhstorfer, 1910
Delias mysis rosseliana Rothschild, 1915
Delias nais denigrata Joicey & Talbot, 1927
Delias nais holophaea Roepke, 1955
Delias nais maruyamai Yagishita, 1993
Delias nais nais Jordan, [1912]
Delias nais odilae Gotts & Ginn, 2004
Delias nais rubrina Van Eecke, 1915
Delias nakanokeikoae jali Van Mastrigt, 1996
Delias nakanokeikoae nakanokeikoae Yagashita, 1993
Delias narses Heller, 1896
Delias neagra albimarginata Talbot, 1929
Delias neagra hypochrysis Roepke, 1955
Delias neagra neagra Jordan, [1912]
Delias neeltje Gerrits & Van Mastrigt, [1993]
Delias niepelti Ribbe, 1900
Delias nieuwenhuisi poponga Van Mastrigt, 1990
Delias nigropunctata Jordan & Noakes, 1915
Delias oktanglap nishiyamai Yagishita, 1993
Delias oktanglap oktanglap Van Mastrigt, 1990
Delias ormoensis Van Mastrigt, 2006
Delias ornytion ornytion (Godman & Salvin, 1881)
Delias ornytion persephone Staudinger, 1895
Delias parennia Roepke, 1955
Delias pheres approximata Joicey & Talbot, 1922
Delias pheres pheres Jordan, [1912]
Delias phippsi mulia Gerrits & Van Mastrigt, [1993]
Delias phippsi phippsi Joicey & Talbot, 1922
Delias phippsi wisseli Roepke, 1955
Delias pratti Kenrick, 1909
Delias pseudomarguerita Gerrits & Van Mastrigt, [1993]
Delias pulla nimivinye Van Mastrigt, 2001
Delias pulla pulla Talbot, 1937
Delias raymondi ogawai Morita, 1996
Delias raymondi raymondi Schröder & Treadaway, 1982
Delias raymondi shirahatai Morita, 1996
Delias rileyi nishizawai Van Mastrigt & Sibatani, 1991
Delias rileyi rileyi Joicey & Talbot, 1922
Delias rileyi yofona Schröder & Treadaway, 1982
Delias roepkei cieko Arima, 1996
Delias rosamontana osadai Yagishita, 1993
Delias rosamontana rosamontana Roepke, 1955
Delias rosamontana tanakaorum Morita, 1996
Delias rosamontana timur Van Mastrigt, 2003
Delias sagessa anjae Schröder, 1977
Delias salvini Butler, 1882
Delias schoenbergi schoenbergi Rothschild, 1895
Delias shunichii Morita, 1996
Delias sigit Van Mastrigt, 1990
Delias sinak Van Mastrigt, 1990
Delias sphenodiscus Roepke, 1955
Delias strix Yagishita, 1993
Delias subapicalis sibatanii Van Mastrigt, 2003
Delias takashii Sakuma, 1999
Delias talboti Joicey & Noakes, 1915
Delias telefominensis ayamiae Sakuma, 1996
Delias telefominensis telefominensis Yagishita, 1993
Delias tessei conspectirubra Joicey & Talbot, 1922
Delias tessei tessei Joicey & Talbot, 1916
Delias thompsoni Joicey & Talbot, 1916
Delias totila Heller, 1896
Delias toxopei morosa Roepke, 1955
Delias toxopei nipsan Van Mastrigt, 1996
Delias toxopei toxopei Roepke, 1955
Delias toxopei uranoi Yagishita, 1993
Delias virgo Gerrits & Van Mastrigt, [1993]
Delias walshae ilu Van Mastrigt, 2000
Delias walshae sanaeae Sakuma, 1999
Delias walshae walshae Roepke, 1955
Delias wollastoni abmisibilensis Van Mastrigt, 1990
Delias wollastoni bryophila Roepke, 1955
Delias wollastoni wollastoni Rothschild, 1915
Delias zebra takanamii Yagishita, 1993
Delias zebra zebra Roepke, 1955
Elodina andropis hydatis Fruhstorfer, 1910
Elodina andropis namatia Fruhstorfer, 1910
Elodina argypheus Grose-Smith, 1890
Elodina biaka Joicey & Noakes, 1915
Elodina definita Joicey & Talbot, 1916
Elodina hypatia hypatia C & R Felder, 1865
Elodina primularis citrinaris (Butler, 1882)
Elodina primularis primularis Butler, 1882
Elodina umbratica Grose-Smith, 1889
Leuciacria acuta Rothschild & Jordan 1905
Leuciacria olivei Muller, 1999
Pareronia jobaea (Boisduval, 1832)
Pareronia chinki Joicey & Noakes, 1915
Saletara cycinna corinna (Wallace, 1867)
Saletara liberia (Cramer, 1779)

Riodinidae
Dicallaneura albosignata Joicey & Talbot, 1916
Dicallaneura amabilis Rothschild, 1904
Dicallaneura decorata (Hewitson, 1862)
Dicallaneura dilectissima Toxopeus, 1944
Dicallaneura ekeikei Bethune-Baker, 1904
Dicallaneura exiguus Joicey, Noakes & Talbot, 1916
Dicallaneura fulvofasciata Joicey, Noakes & Talbot, 1916
Dicallaneura hyacinthus Toxopeus, 1944
Dicallaneura kirschi Röber, 1886
Dicallaneura leucomelas Rothschild & Jordan, 1905
Dicallaneura pelidna Jordan, 1937
Dicallaneura princessa Grose-Smith, 1894
Dicallaneura pulchra (Guérin-Meneville, 1831)
Dicallaneura ribbei Röber, 1886
Dicallaneura virgo Joicey & Talbot, 1916
Praetaxila albiplaga (Röber, 1886)
Praetaxila heterisa (Jordan, 1912)
Praetaxila huntei (Sharpe, 1903)
Praetaxila poultoni Joicey & Talbot, 1922
Praetaxila satraps (Grose-Smith, 1894)
Praetaxila segecia (Hewitson, 1860)
Praetaxila statira (Hewitson, 1862)
Praetaxila tessei Joicey, Noakes & Talbot, 1916
Praetaxila tyrannus (Grose-Smith & Kirby, 1897)
Praetaxila wallacei (Hewitson, 1862)
Praetaxila weiskei (Rothschild, 1901)

Lycaenidae

Curetinae
Curetis barsine fergussoni (Chapman, 1915)
Curetis barsine menestratus Fruhstorfer, 1908
Curetis barsine solita (Butler, 1882)

Miletinae
Liphyra brassolis bougainvilleanus Samson & Smart, 1980
Liphyra brassolis lugens Niepelt, 1921
Liphyra brassolis robusta Felder & Felder, 1865
Liphyra grandis Weymer, 1902
Logania hampsoni Fruhstorfer, 1914
Logania nehalemia Fruhstorfer, 1914
Miletus boisduvali boisduvali Moore, 1857
Miletus leos aronicus Fruhstorfer, 1914
Spalgis asmus Parsons, 1986
Spalgis epius (Westwood, 1851)

Theclinae
Acupicta meeki Eliot, 1974
Amblypodia annetta faisina (Ribbe, 1899)]
Arhopala adherbal Grose-Smith, 1902
Arhopala admete eucolpis (Kirsch, 1877)
Arhopala admete sudesta Evans, 1957
Arhopala aexone (Hewitson, 1863)
Arhopala alkisthenes Fruhstorfer, 1914
Arhopala ander Evans, 1957
Arhopala antharita Grose-Smith, 1894
Arhopala arta Evans, 1957
Arhopala aruana Evans, 1957
Arhopala asma Evans, 1957
Arhopala auxesia (Hewitson, 1863)
Arhopala axina Evans, 1957
Arhopala axiothea (Hewitson, 1863)
Arhopala azenia (Hewitson, 1863)
Arhopala chamaeleona Bethune-Baker, 1903
Arhopala cleander (C. Felder, 1860)
Arhopala critala (C. Felder, 1860)
Arhopala doreena Parsons, 1986
Arhopala eupolis (Miskin, 1890)
Arhopala eurisus eurisus Druce, 1891
Arhopala florinda florinda (Grose-Smith, 1896)
Arhopala florinda pagenstecheri (Ribbe, 1899)
Arhopala fulla (Hewitson, 1862)
Arhopala helianthes Grose-Smith, 1902
Arhopala herculina Staudinger, 1888
Arhopala hylander Grose-Smith, 1894
Arhopala irma Fruhstorfer, 1914
Arhopala kiriwinii Bethune-Baker, 1903
Arhopala leander (Evans, 1957)
Arhopala leo Druce, 1894
Arhopala madytus (Fruhstorfer, 1914)
Arhopala meander Boisduval, 1832
Arhopala micale cidona (Fruhstorfer, 1914)
Arhopala micale micale Blanchard, 1848
Arhopala micale riuna Evans, 1957
Arhopala nobilis C Felder, 1860
Arhopala pagenstecheri (Ribbe, 1899)
Arhopala philander eichhorni Evans, 1957
Arhopala philander gander Evans, 1957
Arhopala philander gazella (Fruhstorfer, 1914)
Arhopala philander meeki Evans, 1957
Arhopala sophilus Fruhstorfer, 1914
Arhopala sophrosyne (Grose-Smith, 1889)
Arhopala styx Fruhstorfer, 1914
Arhopala thamyras minnetta (Butler, 1882)
Arhopala thamyras phryxus (Boisduval, 1832)
Arhopala tindali (Ribbe, 1899)
Arhopala tyrannus C. & R. Felder, 1865
Arhopala wanda Evans, 1957
Arhopala wildei |Arhopala wildei soda Evans, 1957
Artipe grandis (Rothschild & Jordan, 1905)
Artipe dohertyi (Oberthür, 1894)
Bindahara meeki kolmaui Muller & Sands, 1999
Bindahara phocides isabella (C Felder, 1860)
Deudorix affinis (Rothschild, 1915)
Deudorix confusa Tennent, 2000
Deudorix democles (Miskin, 1884)
Deudorix diovis Hewitson, 1863
Deudorix emira Tennent, 2000
Deudorix epijarbas concolor (Joicey & Talbot, 1917)
Deudorix epirus kallias Fruhstorfer, 1908
Deudorix littoralis Joicey & Talbot, 1916
Deudorix maudei Joicey & Talbot, 1916
Deudorix mulleri Tennent, 2000
Deudorix niepelti (Joicey & Talbot, 1922)
Deudorix toxopeusi Tennent, Müller & Rawlins, 2010
Deudorix woodfordi neopommerana Ribbe, 1899
Deudorix woodfordi woodfordi Druce, 1891
Horaga syrinx (C. Felder, 1860)
Hypochlorosis ancharia (Hewitson, 1869)
Hypochlorosis antipha metilia (Fruhstorfer, 1908)
Hypochrysops alyattes alyattes Druce, 1891
Hypochrysops alyattes aristocles (Grose-Smith, 1898)
Hypochrysops antiphon Grose-Smith, 1897
Hypochrysops apelles praeclarus (Fruhstorfer, 1908)
Hypochrysops apollo wendisi (Bethune-Baker, 1909)
Hypochrysops architas architas Druce, 1891
Hypochrysops argyriorufa van Eecke, 1924
Hypochrysops aristobul (Fruhstorfer, 1908)
Hypochrysops arronica honora (Grose-Smith, 1898)
Hypochrysops bakeri (Joicey & Talbot, 1916)
Hypochrysops calliphon Grose-Smith, 1894
Hypochrysops castaneus Sands, 1986
Hypochrysops chrysargyrus Grose-Smith & Kirby, 1895
Hypochrysops cleon Grose-Smith, 1900
Hypochrysops cleonides Grose-Smith, 1900
Hypochrysops coruscans (Grose-Smith, 1897)
Hypochrysops dicomas Hewitson, 1874
Hypochrysops digglesi (Hewitson, 1874)
Hypochrysops dinawa (Bethune-Baker, 1908)
Hypochrysops dohertyi Oberthür, 1894
Hypochrysops elgneri (Waterhouse & Lyell, 1909)
Hypochrysops felderi Oberthür, 1894
Hypochrysops ferruguineus Sands, 1986
Hypochrysops geminatus Sands, 1986
Hypochrysops hermogenes Grose-Smith, 1894
Hypochrysops heros Grose-Smith, 1894
Hypochrysops hippuris Hewitson, 1874
Hypochrysops ignitus (Leach, 1814)
Hypochrysops luteus Sands, 1986
Hypochrysops meeki Rothschild & Jordan, 1905
Hypochrysops mioswara Bethune-Baker, 1913
Hypochrysops miskini (Waterhouse, 1903)
Hypochrysops narcissus (Fabricius, 1775)
Hypochrysops plotinus Grose-Smith, 1894
Hypochrysops polycletus brunnea (Druce, 1902)
Hypochrysops polycletus kaystrus (Fruhstorfer, 1908)
Hypochrysops protogenes C. & R. Felder, 1865
Hypochrysops pythias aurifer (Grose-Smith, 1898)
Hypochrysops ribbei (Röber, 1886)
Hypochrysops rufimargo (Rothschild, 1915)
Hypochrysops scintillans carolina D'Abrera, 1971
Hypochrysops scintillans carveri D'Abrera, 1971
Hypochrysops scintillans mirabilis (Pagenstecher, 1894)
Hypochrysops scintillans scintillans (Butler, 1882)
Hypochrysops scintillans squalliensis D'Abrera, 1971
Hypochrysops siren Grose-Smith, 1894
Hypochrysops theon C. & R. Felder, 1865
Hypochrysops thesaurus Grose-Smith, 1894
Hypolycaena alcestis (Grose-Smith, 1889)
Hypolycaena danis derpiha (Hewitson, 1878)
Hypolycaena danis milo (Grose-Smith, 1896)
Hypolycaena dictaea C & R Felder, 1865
Hypolycaena erylus (Godart, 1824)
Hypolycaena periphorbas Butler, 1882
Hypolycaena phorbas silo Fruhstorfer, 1912
Hypolycaena sipylus (C. Felder, 1860)
Melanolycaena altimontana Sibatani, 1974
Melanolycaena thecloides Sibatani, 1974
Ogyris meeki Rothschild, 1900
Ogyris zosine Hewitson, 1853
Philiris agatha (Grose-Smith, 1899)
Philiris albicostalis Tite, 1963
Philiris albihumerata Tite, 1963
Philiris albiplaga (Joicey & Talbot, 1916)
Philiris amethysta Sands, 1981
Philiris angabunga (Bethune-Baker, 1908)
Philiris apicalis apicalis Tite, 1963
Philiris apicalis ginni Muller, 2002
Philiris aquamarina Sands, 1981
Philiris argentea (Rothschild, 1916)
Philiris azula Wind & Clench, 1947
Philiris baiteta Müller, 2014
Philiris bicolor (Bethune-Baker, 1904)
Philiris biplaga Sands, 1981
Philiris bubalisatina Müller, 2014
Philiris cadmica Sands, 1981
Philiris caelestis Sands, 1979
Philiris diana Waterhouse & Lyell, 1914
Philiris dinawa (Bethune-Baker, 1908)
Philiris doreia Tite, 1963
Philiris elegans Tite, 1963
Philiris fulgens (Grose-Smith & Kirby, 1897)
Philiris gloriosa (Bethune-Baker, 1908)
Philiris harteri (Grose-Smith, 1894)
Philiris helena helena (Snellen, 1887)
Philiris helena speirion (Druce, 1897)
Philiris hemileuca (Jordan, 1930)
Philiris hindenburgensis Müller, 2014
Philiris hypoxantha (Röber, 1926)
Philiris ianthina Tite, 1963
Philiris ignobilis (Joicey & Talbot, 1916)
Philiris innotata (Miskin, 1874)
Philiris intensa birou Wind & Clench, 1947
Philiris intensa regina (Butler, 1882)
Philiris kapaura Tite, 1963
Philiris kumusiensis Tite, 1963
Philiris lavendula Tite, 1963
Philiris lucescens lak Muller, 2002
Philiris lucescens lucescens Tite, 1963
Philiris maculata Sands, 1981
Philiris marginata (Grose-Smith, 1894)
Philiris mayri Wind & Clench, 1947
Philiris melanacra Tite, 1963
Philiris misimensis Wind & Clench, 1947
Philiris moira moira (Grose-Smith, 1899)
Philiris moira riuensis (Tite, 1963)
Philiris montigena Tite, 1963
Philiris nitens (Grose-Smith, 1898)
Philiris oreas Tite, 1963
Philiris pagwi Sands, 1981
Philiris parsonsi Müller, 2014
Philiris petriei Müller, 2014
Philiris phengotes Tite, 1963
Philiris philotoides Tite, 1963
Philiris praeclara Tite, 1963
Philiris putih Wind & Clench, 1947
Philiris radicala Müller, 2014
Philiris refusa (Grose-Smith, 1894)
Philiris remissa Tite, 1963
Philiris satis Tite, 1963
Philiris scintillata Sands, 1981
Philiris siassi krima Muller, 2002
Philiris siassi siassi Sands, 1979
Philiris sibatanii Sands, 1979
Philiris subovata (Grose-Smith, 1894)
Philiris tapini Sands, 1979
Philiris tombara Tite, 1963
Philiris unipunctata (Betune-Baker, 1908)
Philiris vicina (Grose-Smith, 1898)
Philiris violetta (Röber, 1926)
Philiris zadne (Grose-Smith, 1898)
Philiris ziska (Grose-Smith, 1898)
Pseudodipsas eone iovis Fruhstorfer, 1923
Pseudodipsas mulleri Tennent, 2004
Pseudodipsas una (D'Abrera, 1971)
Rapala varuna simsoni (Miskin, 1874)
Titea caerulea (Tite, 1963)
Titea sublutea (Bethune-Baker, 1906)
Virachola democles (Miskin, 1884)

Polyommatinae
Anthene licatus Hewitson, 1874
Anthene lycaenoides orientalis Tennent, 2001
Anthene lycaenoides sutrana (Fruhstorfer, 1916)
Anthene paraffinis emoloides Tite, 1966
Anthene paraffinis matthias Tite, 1966
Anthene paraffinis nissani Tite, 1966
Anthene paraffinis paraffinis (Fruhstorfer, 1916)
Anthene seltuttus seltuttus (Röber, 1886)
Anthene seltuttus violacea (Butler, 1899)
Caleta mindarus vocetius Fruhstorfer, 1918
Callictita albiplaga Joicey & Talbot, 1916
Callictita arfakiana Wind & Clench, 1947
Callictita cyara Bethune-Baker, 1908
Callictita felgara Parsons, 1986
Callictita jola Parsons, 1986
Callictita lara Parsons, 1986
Callictita mala Parsons, 1986
Callictita tifala Parsons, 1986
Callictita upola Parsons & Hirowatari, 1986
Candalides afretta Parsons, 1986
Candalides ardosiacea (Tite, 1963)
Candalides coeruleus (Röber, 1886)
Candalides cupreus (Röber, 1886)
Candalides erinus sudesta Tite, 1963
Candalides grandissima Bethune-Baker, 1906
Candalides helenita (Semper, 1879)
Candalides lamia (Grose-Smith, 1897)
Candalides limbata (Tite, 1963)
Candalides margarita (Semper, 1879)
Candalides meforensis (Tite, 1963)
Candalides neurapacuna Bethune-Baker, 1908
Candalides parsonsi Tennent, 2005
Candalides pruina Druce, 1904
Candalides riuensis (Tite, 1963)
Candalides silicea (Grose-Smith, 1894)
Candalides tringa (Grose-Smith, 1894)
Candalides viriditincta (Tite, 1963)
Catochrysops amasea amasea Waterhouse & Lyell, 1914
Catochrysops nubila Tite, 1959
Catochrysops panormus pura Tite, 1959
Catochrysops strabo celebensis Tite, 1959
Catopyrops ancyra amaura (Druce, 1891)
Catopyrops ancyra complicata (Butler, 1882)
Catopyrops ancyra distincta Tite, 1963
Catopyrops ancyra mysia (Waterhouse & Lyell, 1914)
Catopyrops ancyra procella Tite, 1963
Catopyrops holtra Parsons, 1986
Catopyrops keiria keiria (Druce, 1891)
Catopyrops kokopona (Ribbe, 1899)
Catopyrops zyx Parsons, 1986
Celastrina acesina (Bethune-Baker, 1906)
Celastrina lavendularis (Moore, 1877)
Celastrina philippina nedda (Grose-Smith, 1894)
Danis concolor (Rothschild, 1916)
Danis danis dispar (Grose-Smith & Kirby, 1895)
Danis danis lampros (Druce, 1897)
Danis danis latifascia (Rothschild, 1915)
Danis danis regina (Kirby, 1889)
Danis danis suleima (Grose-Smith, 1898)
Danis danis zuleika (Grose-Smith, 1898)
Danis drucei (Grose-Smith & Kirby, 1895)
Danis glaucopis (Grose-Smith, 1894)
Danis hengis (Grose-Smith, 1897)
Danis melimnos (Druce & Bethune-Baker, 1893)
Danis metrophanes (Fruhstorfer, 1915)
Danis phroso (Grose-Smith, 1897)
Danis regalis Grose-Smith & Kirby, 1895
Danis wallacei (C. & R. Felder, 1865)
Discolampa albula (Grose-Smith, 1897)
Epimastidia arienis arienis Druce, 1891
Epimastidia arienis bornemanni (Pagenstecher, 1894)
Epimastidia inops pilumna (Druce, 1894)
Epimastidia yiwikana Schröder, 2010
Erysichton albiplaga Tite, 1963
Erysichton lineata insularis Tite, 1963
Erysichton lineata meiranganus (Röber, 1886)
Erysichton lineata uluensis (Ribbe, 1899)
Erysichton lineata vincula (Druce, 1891)
Erysichton palmyra clara Tite, 1963
Erysichton palmyra coelia (Grose-Smith, 1894)
Erysichton palmyra lateplaga Tite, 1963
Euchrysops cnejus cnidus Waterhouse and Lyell, 1914
Everes lacturnus palliensis (Ribbe, 1899)
Everes lacturnus pulchra (Rothschild, 1915)
Famegana alsulus Herrich-Schäffer, 1869
Freyeria trochylus (Freyer, 1844)
Ionolyce brunnescens brunnescens Tite, 1963
Ionolyce helicon caracalla (Waterhouse & Lyell, 1914)
Ionolyce selkon Parsons, 1986
Jamides aetherialis caerulina (Mathew, 1887)
Jamides aleuas (C. & R. Felder, 1865)
Jamides allectus sarmice (Fruhstorfer, 1915)
Jamides amarauge amarauge Druce, 1891
Jamides aruensis (Pagenstecher, 1884)
Jamides bochus (Stoll, 1782)
Jamides celeno sundara (Fruhstorfer, 1915)
Jamides cephion Druce, 1891
Jamides coritus pseudeuchylas (Strand, 1911)
Jamides cyta amphissina (Grose-Smith, 1894)
Jamides nemophila albipatulus Tite, 1960
Jamides nemophila nemophila (Butler, 1876)
Jamides nemophila paralectus (Grose-Smith & Kirby, 1897)
Jamides nitens (Joicey & Talbot, 1916)
Jamides philatus Snellen, 1878
Jamides pseudosias coeligena (Joicey & Talbot, 1916)
Jamides reverdini (Fruhstorfer, 1915)
Jamides soemias purpurata (Grose-Smith, 1894)
Jamides soemias soemias Druce, 1891
Lampides boeticus (Linnaeus, 1767)
Leptotes plinius pseudocassius (Murray, 1873)
Luthrodes cleotas cleotas (Guérin-Méneville, 1831)
Luthrodes cleotas gades (Fruhstorfer, 1915)
Lycaenopsis haraldus (Fabricius, 1787)
Megisba strongyle caudata (Eliot & Kawazoé, 1983)
Megisba strongyle clerica (Fruhstorfer, 1918)
Megisba strongyle monacha (Grose-Smith, 1894)
Monodontides argioloides (Rothschild, 1916)
Nacaduba berenice apira Fruhstorfer, 1916
Nacaduba berenice korene (Druce, 1891)
Nacaduba cajetani Tite, 1963
Nacaduba calauria (C. & R. Felder, 1860)
Nacaduba cyanea chromia (Druce, 1891)
Nacaduba cyanea epicoritus (Boisduval, 1832)
Nacaduba cyanea hamilcar (Grose-Smith, 1894)
Nacaduba cyanea rosselana (Bethune-Baker, 1908)
Nacaduba hermus (C. Felder, 1860)
Nacaduba kurava cyaneira (Fruhstorfer, 1916)
Nacaduba kurava ariitea (Fruhstorfer, 1916)
Nacaduba kurava lydia (Fruhstorfer, 1916)
Nacaduba kurava pacifica Toxopeus, 1927
Nacaduba kurava rothschildi Toxopeus, 1927
Nacaduba lucana Tite, 1963
Nacaduba major (Rothschild, 1915)
Nacaduba mallicollo markira Tite, 1963
Nacaduba mioswara Tite, 1963
Nacaduba nerine (Grose-Smith & Kirby, 1899)
Nacaduba novaehebridensis vulcana Tite, 1963
Nacaduba pactolus antalcidas Fruhstorfer, 1915
Nacaduba pactolus bilikii Tennent, 2000
Nacaduba pactolus raluana Ribbe, 1899
Nacaduba ruficirca Tite, 1963
Nacaduba schneideri (Ribbe, 1899)
Nacaduba subperusia martha Eliot, 1955
Nacaduba subperusia uniformis (Rothschild, 1915)
Nacaduba tristis Rothschild, 1915
Nacaduba vulcana Tite, 1963
Nacaduba zaron Muller, 2002
Neopithecops lucifer heria (Fruhstorfer, 1919)
Nothodanis schaeffera caesius (Grose-Smith, 1894)
Nothodanis schaeffera cepheis (Druce, 1891)
Nothodanis schaeffera esme (Grose-Smith, 1894)
Paraduba metriodes (Bethune-Baker, 1911)
Paraduba owgarra Bethune-Baker, 1906
Parelodina aroa Bethune-Baker, 1904
Perpheres perpheres (Druce & Bethune-Baker, 1893)
Petrelaea tombugensis (Röber, 1886)
Pistoria nigropunctata (Bethune-Baker, 1908)
Pithecops dionisius dionisius (Boisduval, 1832)
Pithecops dionisius staphylus Fruhstorfer, 1919
Prosotas atra Tite, 1963
Prosotas dubiosa dubiosa (Semper, 1879)
Prosotas dubiosa eborata Tite, 1963
Prosotas gracilis saturatior (Rothschild, 1915)
Prosotas nora caliginosa (Druce, 1891)
Prosotas nora nora (C Felder, 1860)
Prosotas papuana Tite, 1963
Prosotas russelli Tennent, 2003
Prosotas talesea Tite, 1963
Psychonotis brownii (Druce & Bethune-Baker, 1893)
Psychonotis caelius hanno (Grose-Smith, 1894)
Psychonotis caelius manusi (Rothschild, 1915)
Psychonotis caelius mayae (D'Abrera, 1971)
Psychonotis caelius plotinus (Grose-Smith & Kirby, 1896)
Psychonotis hebes (Druce, 1904)
Psychonotis kruera (Druce, 1891)
Psychonotis melanae (Joicey & Talbot, 1916)
Psychonotis parsonsi Muller, 2003
Sahulana scintillata (Lucas, 1889)
Tartesa astarte albescens (Tite, 1960)
Tartesa astarte astarte (Butler, 1882)
Tartesa astarte nissani (Tite, 1960)
Thaumaina uranothauma Bethune-Baker, 1908
Theclinesthes miskini arnoldi (Fruhstorfer, 1916)
Theclinesthes miskini brandti Sibatani & Grund, 1978
Udara antonia Eliot & Kawazoe, 1983
Udara cardia cardia (C Felder, 1860)
Udara cybele Eliot & Kawazoe, 1983
Udara davenporti Parsons, 1986
Udara dilecta (Moore, 1879)
Udara drucei tennenti Muller, 2002
Udara kodama Eliot & Kawazoe, 1983
Udara laetitia Eliot & Kawazoe, 1983
Udara manokwariensis (Joicey, Noakes & Talbot, 1916)
Udara meeki (Bethune-Baker, 1906)
Udara owgarra (Bethune-Baker, 1906)
Udara pullus (Joicey & Talbot, 1916)
Udara rona rona (Grose-Smith, 1894)
Udara sibatanii Eliot & Kawazoe, 1983
Upolampes evena (Hewitson, 1876)
Zizeeria karsandra (Moore, 1865)
Zizina labradus aruensis (Swinhoe, 1916)
Zizina labradus lampra (Tite, 1969)
Zizula hylax dampierensis (Rothschild, 1915)

Nymphalidae

Libytheinae
Libythea geoffroy maenia Fruhstorfer, 1909
Libythea geoffroy orientalis (Godman & Salvin, 1888)
Libythea geoffroy pulchra (Butler, 1882)
Libythea narina hatami Kenrick, 1911

Danainae
Danaus affinis affinis (Fabricius, 1775)
Danaus affinis bipuncta (Talbot, 1943)
Danaus affinis biseriata (Butler, 1882)
Danaus affinis bonguensis Fruhstorfer, 1899
Danaus affinis decipiens (Butler, 1882)
Danaus affinis decipientis (Strand, 1914)
Danaus affinis fergussonia (Fruhstorfer, 1907)
Danaus affinis galacterion Fruhstorfer, 1906
Danaus affinis jobiensis (Grose-Smith, 1894)
Danaus affinis kiriwina (Fruhstorfer, 1907)
Danaus affinis kobakma Van Mastrigt, 2009
Danaus affinis mytilene (C. & R. Felder, 1860)
Danaus affinis obscura (Capronnier, 1886)
Danaus affinis pleistarchus (Fruhstorfer, 1912)
Danaus affinis sabrona Talbot, 1943
Danaus affinis strephon Fruhstorfer, 1906
Danaus affinis subnigra (Joicey & Talbot, 1922)
Danaus affinis woodlarkiana (Fruhstorfer, 1907)
Danaus petilia (Stoll, 1790)
Danaus plexippus plexippus (Linnaeus, 1758)
Euploea albicosta Joicey & Noakes, 1915
Euploea alcathoe macgregori (Kirby, 1889)
Euploea alcathoe melinda Grose-Smith, 1894
Euploea alcathoe occulta (Butler, 1877)
Euploea alcathoe pierretii C. & R. Felder, 1865
Euploea algea cissia Fruhstorfer, 1910
Euploea algea irene (Fruhstorfer, 1910)
Euploea algea lachrymosa Grose-Smith, 1894
Euploea algea tenebrosa Grose-Smith, 1894
Euploea algea violetta (Butler, 1876)
Euploea asyllus asyllus Godman & Salvin, 1888
Euploea batesii auritincta Carpenter, 1953
Euploea batesii honesta (Butler, 1882)
Euploea batesii mimica Fruhstorfer, 1910
Euploea batesii pinaria Fruhstorfer, 1910
Euploea batesii publilia Fruhstorfer, 1910
Euploea batesii resarta (Butler, 1876)
Euploea batesii rotunda van Eecke, 1915
Euploea batesii trobriandensis Carpenter, 1953
Euploea boisduvalii fraudulenta (Butler, 1882)
Euploea charox illudens (Butler, 1882)
Euploea charox mathiasana (Carpenter, 1942)
Euploea charox subnobilis (Strand, 1914)
Euploea climena nobilis (Strand, 1914)
Euploea core charox Kirsch, 1877
Euploea doretta (Pagenstecher, 1894)
Euploea eboraci (Grose-Smith, 1894)
Euploea eurianassa (Hewitson, 1858)
Euploea lacon (Grose-Smith, 1894)
Euploea leucostictos affinita (Strand, 1914)
Euploea leucostictos eustachius (Kirby, 1889)
Euploea leucostictos herbstii Boisduval, 1832
Euploea leucostictos messia (Fruhstorfer, 1910)
Euploea leucostictos oeneon (Fruhstorfer, 1912)
Euploea leucostictos oppia Fruhstorfer, 1910
Euploea leucostictos perdita (Butler, 1882)
Euploea leucostictos polymela (Godman & Salvin, 1888)
Euploea leucostictos pulchella (Carpenter, 1942)
Euploea leucostictos staintonii C. & R. Felder, 1865
Euploea leucostictos swierstrae Snellen, 1891
Euploea modesta cerberus (Butler, 1882)
Euploea modesta griseitincta (Carpenter, 1942)
Euploea modesta incerta Joicey & Noakes, 1915
Euploea modesta insulicola (Strand, 1914)
Euploea modesta jennessi (Carpenter, 1941)
Euploea modesta lugens Butler, 1876
Euploea morosa lugubris (Grose-Smith, 1894)
Euploea nechos nechos Mathew, 1887
Euploea netscheri netscheri Snellen, 1889
Euploea netscheri numantia Fruhstorfer, 1910
Euploea phaenareta admiralia (Strand, 1914)
Euploea phaenareta arova (Fruhstorfer, 1913)
Euploea phaenareta callithoe (Boisduval, 1832)
Euploea phaenareta eurykleia (Fruhstorfer, 1910)
Euploea phaenareta heurippa (Godman & Salvin, 1888)
Euploea phaenareta mesocala Vollenhoven, 1873
Euploea phaenareta morna (Fruhstorfer, 1912)
Euploea phaenareta sacerdotalis Fruhstorfer, 1910
Euploea phaenareta unibrunnea (Salvin & Godman, 1877)
Euploea stephensii bismarckiana (Fruhstorfer, 1900)
Euploea stephensii flaminia Fruhstorfer, 1904
Euploea stephensii garcila Fruhstorfer, 1910
Euploea stephensii jamesi (Butler, 1876)
Euploea stephensii kirschii Moore, 1883
Euploea stephensii nivani Carpenter, 1953
Euploea stephensii pumila Butler, 1866
Euploea stephensii salabanda Kirsch, 1877
Euploea stephensii sisamis Kirsch, 1877
Euploea stephensii stephensii C. & R. Felder, [1865]
Euploea sylvester doleschalii (C & R Felder, 1859)
Euploea treitschkei aebutia Fruhstorfer, 1910
Euploea treitschkei aenea (Butler, 1882)
Euploea treitschkei coerulescens (Pagenstecher, 1894)
Euploea treitschkei mattyensis Fruhstorfer, 1912
Euploea treitschkei suffusca (Carpenter, 1953)
Euploea treitschkei treitschkei Boisduval, 1832
Euploea treitschkei ursula (Butler, 1883)
Euploea treitschkei viridis (Butler, 1882)
Euploea tripunctata Joicey & Noakes, 1915
Euploea tulliolus doryca Butler, 1878
Euploea tulliolus dudgeonis (Grose-Smith, 1894)
Euploea tulliolus goodenoughi (Carpenter, 1942)
Euploea tulliolus mangolinella (Strand, 1914)
Euploea tulliolus nocturna Fruhstorfer, 1904
Euploea tulliolus offaka Fruhstorfer, 1904
Euploea usipetes rezia (Kirby, 1894)
Euploea wallacei confusa Butler, 1866
Euploea wallacei melia (Fruhstorfer, 1904)
Idea durvillei durvillei Boisduval, 1832
Idea durvillei hemera (Fruhstorfer, 1903)
Idea durvillei metris (Fruhstorfer, 1903)
Idea durvillei nike (Fruhstorfer, 1903)
Ideopsis fojana Peggie, Vane-Wright & Van Mastrigt, 2009
Ideopsis hewitsonii Kirsch, 1877
Ideopsis juventa bosnika (Talbot, 1943)
Ideopsis juventa catella (Fruhstorfer, 1912)
Ideopsis juventa eugenia (Fruhstorfer, 1907)
Ideopsis juventa hollandia (Talbot, 1943)
Ideopsis juventa kolleri (Hulstaert, 1923)
Ideopsis juventa purpurata (Butler, 1866)
Ideopsis juventa sobrina (Boisduval, 1832)
Ideopsis juventa sobrinoides (Butler, 1882)
Ideopsis juventa tanais (Fruhstorfer, 1904)
Ideopsis vitrea arfakensis Fruhstorfer, 1898
Ideopsis vitrea inuncta (Butler, 1865)
Ideopsis vitrea onina Talbot, 1940
Ideopsis vitrea serena Joicey & Talbot, 1916
Miriamica weiskei (Rothschild, 1901)
Miriamica thalassina (Joicey & Noakes, 1916)
Parantica clinias (Grose-Smith, 1890)
Parantica fuscela berak Muller, 2002
Parantica fuscela fuscela Parsons, 1989
Parantica garamantis dilatata (Joicey & Talbot, 1925)
Parantica kirbyi (Grose-Smith, 1894)
Parantica melusine meeki (Grose-Smith, 1897)
Parantica rotundata rookensis (Joicey & Talbot, 1925)
Parantica rotundata rotundata (Grose-Smith, 1890)
Parantica schenkii periphas (Fruhstorfer, 1910)
Parantica schenkii schenkii (Koch, 1865)
Protoploea apatela (Joicey & Talbot, 1925)
Tellervo assarica macrofallax Strand, 1911
Tellervo assarica jobinus Fruhstorfer, 1911
Tellervo assarica limetanus Fruhstorfer, 1911
Tellervo assarica mioswara Ackery, 1987
Tellervo assarica mysolensis Joicey & Talbot, 1922
Tellervo assarica salawatica Ackery, 1987
Tellervo assarica strandi Ackery, 1987
Tellervo assarica talboti Ackery, 1987
Tellervo hiero hiero (Godman & Salvin, 1888)
Tellervo jurriaansei Joicey & Talbot, 1922
Tellervo nedusia biakensis Joicey& Noakes, 1916
Tellervo nedusia coalescens Rothschild, 1915
Tellervo nedusia fallax (Staudinger, 1885)
Tellervo nedusia jobia Ackery, 1987
Tellervo nedusia meforicus Fruhstorfer, 1910
Tellervo nedusia mysoriensis (Staudinger, 1885)
Tellervo nedusia nedusia (Geyer, 1832)
Tellervo nedusia papuensis Ackery, 1987
Tellervo nedusia talesea Ackery, 1987
Tellervo nedusia wangaarica Ackery, 1987
Tellervo nedusia wollastoni Rothschild, 1916
Tellervo parvipuncta parvipuncta Joicey & Talbot, 1922
Tellervo parvipuncta separata Ackery, 1987
Tellervo zoilus aequicinctus (Salvin & Godman, 1877)
Tellervo zoilus antipatrus Fruhstorfer, 1911
Tellervo zoilus distincta Rothschild, 1915
Tellervo zoilus digulica Hulstaert, 1924
Tellervo zoilus duba Ackery, 1987
Tellervo zoilus lavonga Ackery, 1987
Tellervo zoilus misima Ackery, 1987
Tellervo zoilus mujua Ackery, 1987
Tellervo zoilus sarcapus Fruhstorfer, 1911
Tellervo zoilus tagula Ackery, 1987
Tirumala hamata coarctata (Joicey & Talbot, 1922)
Tirumala hamata leucoptera (Butler, 1874)
Tirumala hamata obscurata (Butler, 1874)
Tirumala hamata pallidula (Talbot, 1943)
Tirumala hamata subnubila (Talbot, 1943)

Morphinae
Hyantis hodeva fuliginosa Grose-Smith, 1898
Hyantis hodeva helvola Stichel, 1905
Hyantis hodeva hodeva Hewitson, 1862
Hyantis hodeva xanthophthalma Röber, 1903
Morphopsis albertisi aigion Fruhstorfer, 1911
Morphopsis albertisi albertisi Oberthür, 1880
Morphopsis phippsi Joicey & Talbot, 1922
Morphopsis biakensis Joicey & Talbot, 1916
Morphopsis ula brunnifascia Joicey, Noakes & Talbot, 1916
Taenaris artemis affinis (Kirby, 1889)
Taenaris artemis artemis (Snellen, 1860)
Taenaris artemis blandina Fruhstorfer, 1904
Taenaris artemis celsa Fruhstorfer, 1904
Taenaris artemis electra Fruhstorfer, 1904
Taenaris artemis gisela Fruhstorfer, 1904
Taenaris artemis humboldti Fruhstorfer, 1904
Taenaris artemis madu Brooks, 1944
Taenaris artemis melanops (Grose-Smith, 1897)
Taenaris artemis tineutus Fruhstorfer, 1905
Taenaris artemis zenada Fruhstorfer, 1904
Taenaris artemis ziada Fruhstorfer, 1904
Taenaris bioculatus albius Brooks, 1950
Taenaris bioculatus avarea Fruhstorfer, 1916
Taenaris bioculatus bioculatus (Guérin-Méneville, 1831)
Taenaris bioculatus charon Staudinger, 1887
Taenaris bioculatus grisescens Rothschild, 1915
Taenaris catops adriana Fruhstorfer, 1904
Taenaris catops fimbriata (Kirby, 1889)
Taenaris catops fulvida Butler, 1870
Taenaris catops galaecia Fruhstorfer, 1910
Taenaris catops jathrippa Fruhstorfer, 1916
Taenaris catops jobina Fruhstorfer, 1904
Taenaris catops kajuna Fruhstorfer, 1904
Taenaris catops laretta Fruhstorfer, 1904
Taenaris catops mylaecha (Westwood, 1851)
Taenaris catops pamphaga Kirsch, 1877
Taenaris catops rosseliana Rothschild, 1916
Taenaris catops selenides Staudinger, 1887
Taenaris cyclops acontius Brooks, 1944
Taenaris cyclops cyclops Staudinger, 1893
Taenaris cyclops interfaunis Rothschild, 1916
Taenaris cyclops misolensis Rothschild, 1916
Taenaris cyclops occidentalis Rothschild, 1916
Taenaris dimona anna Fruhstorfer, 1915
Taenaris dimona didorus Brooks, 1944
Taenaris dimona dimonata Stichel, 1906
Taenaris dimona kapaura Fruhstorfer, 1904
Taenaris dimona microps Grose-Smith, 1894
Taenaris dimona offaka Fruhstorfer, 1905
Taenaris dimona sorronga Fruhstorfer, 1905
Taenaris dimona zaitha Fruhstorfer, 1915
Taenaris dina insularis Rothschild, 1916
Taenaris dina sordidior Rothschild, 1916
Taenaris dioptrica amitaba Fruhstorfer, 1904
Taenaris dioptrica dioptrica (Snellen, 1860)
Taenaris dioptrica rileyi Hulstaert, 1925
Taenaris gorgo danalis Fruhstorfer, 1904
Taenaris gorgo gorgo (Kirsch, 1877)
Taenaris gorgo gorgophone Fruhstorfer,1904
Taenaris gorgo lucina Brooks, 1944
Taenaris gorgo mera Fruhstorfer, 1905
Taenaris honrathi honrathi Staudinger, 1886
Taenaris honrathi ladas Brooks, 1950
Taenaris honrathi ritsemae Fruhstorfer, 1904
Taenaris honrathi sekarensis Staudinger, 1887
Taenaris hyperbolus hyaeus Brooks, 1950
Taenaris hyperbolus hyginus Brooks, 1950
Taenaris hyperbolus hyperbolus (Kirsch, 1877)
Taenaris hyperbolus versteegi Van Eecke, 1915
Taenaris mailua convergens (Rothschild, 1916)
Taenaris mailua rosseli Fruhstorfer, 1905
Taenaris myops ansuna Fruhstorfer, 1904
Taenaris myops fergussonia Westwood, 1851
Taenaris myops kirschi (Staudinger, 1887)
Taenaris myops merana Fruhstorfer, 1904
Taenaris myops parallelus Rothschild, 1916
Taenaris myops phrixus Brooks, 1950
Taenaris myops praxedes Fruhstorfer, 1904
Taenaris myops rothschildi Grose-Smith, 1894
Taenaris myops vanhaasterti Hulstaert, 1925
Taenaris onolaus onolaus (Kirsch, 1877)
Taenaris onolaus shapur Brooks, 1944
Taenaris phorcas admiralitatis Rothschild, 1916
Taenaris phorcas phorcas (Westwood, 1856)
Taenaris schoenbergi schoenbergi (Fruhstorfer, 1893)
Taenaris schoenbergi vanheurni Bakker, 1942
Taenaris scylla Staudinger, 1887

Satyrinae
Altiapa colorata (Nishizawa & Sibatani, 1984)
Altiapa decolor (Rothschild & Jordan, 1905)
Altiapa klossi (Rothschild, 1916)
Altiapa pandora goliathina (Jordan, 1924)
Altiapa pandora pandora (Joicey & Talbot, 1916)
Argyronympha pulchra Mathew, 1886
Argyronympha rubianensis rubianensis Grose-Smith, 1889
Elymnias agondas agondas (Boisduval, 1832)
Elymnias agondas aruana Fruhstorfer, 1900
Elymnias agondas bioculatus Hewitson, 1851
Elymnias agondas melanippe (Grose-Smith, 1894)
Elymnias agondas melantho Wallace, 1869
Elymnias cybele holofernes (Butler, 1882)
Elymnias cybele thryallis Kirsch, 1877
Elymnias hypermnestra (Linnaeus, 1763)
Elymnias papua bivitata van Eecke, 1915
Elymnias papua cinereomargo Joicey & Noakes, 1915
Elymnias papua kakarona Hagen, 1897
Elymnias papua papua Wallace, 1869
Elymnias papua viridescens Grose-Smith, 1894
Elymnias paradoxa Staudinger, 1894
Erycinidia maudei Joicey & Talbot, 1916
Erycinidia virgo (Rothschild & Jordan, 1905)
Harsiesis hecaerge (Hewitson, 1863)
Harsiesis hygea hygea (Hewitson, 1863)
Harsiesis hygea jobina Fruhstorfer, 1911
Harsiesis yolanthe Fruhstorfer, 1913
Hypocysta aroa calypso Grose-Smith, 1897
Hypocysta haemonia fenestrella Fruhstorfer, 1911
Hypocysta haemonia haemonia Hewitson, 1863
Hypocysta haemonia pelusiota Fruhstorfer, 1911
Hypocysta isis lepida Jordan, 1924
Hypocysta isis pelagia Fruhstorfer, 1911
Hypocysta osyris waigeuensis Joicey & Talbot, 1917
Hypocysta serapis Grose-Smith, 1894
Lamprolenis nitida Godman & Salvin, 1880
Melanitis amabilis amabilis (Boisduval, 1832)
Melanitis amabilis valentina Fruhstorfer, 1908
Melanitis constantia constantia (Cramer, 1777)
Melanitis constantia despoliata Fruhstorfer, 1908
Melanitis leda bouruana Holland, 1900
Melanitis leda salomonis Fruhstorfer, 1908
Mycalesis aethiops Butler, 1868
Mycalesis asophis Hewitson, 1862
Mycalesis barbara fulvooculatus Joicey, Noakes & Talbot, 1916
Mycalesis barbara pallida Joicey & Talbot, 1916
Mycalesis bazochii (Guérin-Méneville, 1831)
Mycalesis biformis Rothschild, 1916
Mycalesis bilineata Fruhstorfer, 1906
Mycalesis cacodaemon bizonata Grose-Smith, 1902
Mycalesis cacodaemon cacodaemon Kirsch, 1877
Mycalesis comes Grose-Smith, 1894
Mycalesis discobolus Fruhstorfer, 1906
Mycalesis drusillodes (Oberthür, 1894)
Mycalesis duponchelii duponchelii (Guérin-Méneville, 1831)
Mycalesis duponchelii eminens Staudinger, 1893
Mycalesis duponchelii eudoxia Fruhstorfer, 1906
Mycalesis duponchelii kapaura Fruhstorfer, 1906
Mycalesis duponchelii maforica Fruhstorfer, 1906
Mycalesis duponchelii roonia Fruhstorfer, 1906
Mycalesis duponchelii umbonia Fruhstorfer, 1906
Mycalesis durga durga Grose-Smith & Kirby, 1894
Mycalesis durga jobina Fruhstorfer, 1906
Mycalesis elia Grose-Smith, 1894
Mycalesis fulvianetta fulvianetta Rothschild, 1916
Mycalesis fulvianetta semicastanea Joicey & Talbot, 1916
Mycalesis giamana Parsons, 1986
Mycalesis mehadeva fulviana Grose-Smith, 1894
Mycalesis mehadeva mehadeva (Boisduval, 1832)
Mycalesis mucia etha Fruhstorfer, 1908
Mycalesis mucia febronia Fruhstorfer, 1911
Mycalesis mucia mucia Hewitson, 1862
Mycalesis mulleri Tennent, 2000
Mycalesis perseus lalassis (Hewitson, 1864)
Mycalesis perseus perseus (Fabricius, 1775)
Mycalesis phidon phidon Hewitson, 1862
Mycalesis phidon phidonides Fruhstorfer, 1908
Mycalesis phidon xanthias (Grose-Smith, 1896)
Mycalesis shiva maura (Grose-Smith, 1894)
Mycalesis shiva shiva (Boisduval, 1832)
Mycalesis sirius sirius (Fabricius, 1775)
Mycalesis splendens versicolor Tennent, 2002
Mycalesis terminus atropates Fruhstorfer, 1908
Mycalesis terminus flagrans (Butler, 1876)
Mycalesis terminus matho (Grose-Smith, 1894)
Mycalesis terminus terminulus Fruhstorfer, 1908
Mycalesis valeria helena D'Abrera, 1971
Orsotriaena medus licium Fruhstorfer, 1908
Platypthima dispar dispar Joicey & Talbot, 1922
Platypthima homochroa satisbona Jordan, 1924
Platypthima placiva Jordan, 1924
Ypthima arctoa subarctua Tryon, 1890

Charaxinae
Charaxes latona cimonides Grose-Smith, 1894
Charaxes latona diana Rothschild, 1898
Charaxes latona discipicta Strand, 1914
Charaxes latona layardi (Butler, 1896)
Charaxes latona leto Rothschild, 1898
Charaxes latona papuensis Butler, 1869
Polyura epigenes monochromus (Niepelt, 1914)
Polyura jupiter admiralitatis (Rothschild, 1915)
Polyura jupiter attila (Grose-Smith, 1889)
Polyura jupiter jupiter (Butler, 1869)
Prothoe australis australis (Guérin-Méneville, 1831)
Prothoe australis hewitsoni (Wallace, 1869)
Prothoe australis satgeii Joicey & Noakes, 1915
Prothoe australis schulzi (Ribbe, 1898)
Prothoe australis westwoodi Wallace, 1869
Prothoe layardi (Godman & Salvin, 1882)
Prothoe ribbei Rothschild, 1895

Apaturinae
Apaturina erminea neopommerania Hagen, 1897
Apaturina erminea octavia Fruhstorfer, 1904
Apaturina erminea papuana Ribbe, 1886
Apaturina erminea sorimachii Morita & Kawamura, 1998
Apaturina erminea xanthocera Rothschild, 1904
Cyrestis achates achates Butler, 1865
Cyrestis achates nedymnus C. & R. Felder, 1865
Cyrestis acilia acilia (Godart, 1819)
Cyrestis acilia dola Fruhstorfer, 1904
Cyrestis acilia fratercula (Salvin & Godman, 1877)
Cyrestis acilia nitida (Mathew, 1887)
Cyrestis paulinus waigeuensis Fruhstorfer, 1900
Cyrestis telamon adaemon (Godman & Salvin, 1879)
Cyrestis telamon bougainvillei (Ribbe, 1898)
Dichorragia ninus distinctus Röber, 1894
Helcyra chionippe marginata Rothschild & Jordan, 1899

Limenitidinae
Euthalia aeropa angustifascia Joicey & Noakes, 1915
Euthalia aeropa choirilus Fruhstorfer, 1913
Euthalia aeropa eutychius Fruhstorfer, 1913
Euthalia aeropa nodrica Boisduval, 1832
Euthalia aetion donata (Fruhstorfer, 1907)
Euthalia aetion philomena (Fruhstorfer, 1905)
Neptis brebissonii brebissonii (Boisduval, 1832)
Neptis brebissonii dulcinea Grose-Smith, 1898
Neptis brebissonii metioche Fruhstorfer, 1908
Neptis nausica lyria Fruhstorfer, 1908
Neptis nausica nausica de Nicéville, 1897
Neptis nausica nivalis Talbot, 1932
Neptis nausica symbiosa Fruhstorfer, 1908
Neptis nausica syxosa Fruhstorfer, 1908
Neptis praslini dorcas Grose-Smith, 1894
Neptis praslini maionia Fruhstorfer, 1908
Neptis praslini meforensis Eliot, 1969
Neptis praslini messogis Fruhstorfer, 1908
Neptis praslini praslini (Boisduval, 1832)
Neptis praslini ronensis Grose-Smith, 1899
Neptis praslini woodlarkiana (Montrouzier, 1856)
Neptis satina Grose-Smith, 1894
Pantoporia consimilis biaka Eliot, 1969
Pantoporia consimilis consimilis (Boisduval, 1832)
Pantoporia consimilis continua (Staudinger, 1888)
Pantoporia consimilis eurygrapha (Fruhstorfer, 1908)
Pantoporia consimilis mioswara (Talbot, 1932)
Pantoporia consimilis novahibernica Eliot, 1969
Pantoporia consimilis stenopa (Fruhstorfer, 1908)
Pantoporia consimilis vulcanica Eliot, 1969
Pantoporia venilia albopunctata (Joicey & Noakes, 1915)
Pantoporia venilia anceps Grose-Smith, 1894
Pantoporia venilia glyceria (Fruhstorfer, 1908)
Pantoporia venilia louisa Eliot, 1969
Pantoporia venilia novohannoverana (Pagenstecher, 1900)
Pantoporia venilia pseudovenilia Fruhstorfer, 1908
Pantoporia venilia tadema (Fruhstorfer, 1908)
Parthenos sylvia admiralia Rothschild, 1915
Parthenos sylvia couppei Ribbe, 1898
Parthenos sylvia guineensis Fruhstorfer, 1898
Parthenos sylvia thesaurus (Mathew, 1887)
Parthenos tigrina tigrina Snellen van Vollenhoven, 1866
Phaedyma ampliata (Butler, 1882)
Phaedyma fissizonata pisias (Godman & Salvin, 1888)
Phaedyma shepherdi damia Fruhstorfer, 1905
Phaedyma shepherdi gregalis (Joicey & Noakes, 1915)
Phaedyma shepherdi maculosa (Joicey & Talbot, 1922)
Tanaecia palguna Moore, 1857

Nymphalinae
Doleschallia bisaltide nasica Fruhstorfer, 1907
Doleschallia bisaltide nigromarginata Joicey & Noakes, 1915
Doleschallia browni browni Salvin & Godman, 1877
Doleschallia browni sciron (Godman & Salvin, 1888)
Doleschallia dascon Godman & Salvin, 1880
Doleschallia hexophthalmos areus Fruhstorfer, 1907
Doleschallia hexophthalmos donus Fruhstorfer, 1915
Doleschallia hexophthalmos kapaurensis Fruhstorfer, 1899
Doleschallia hexophthalmos varus Fruhstorfer, 1912
Doleschallia nacar comrii (Godman & Salvin, 1878)
Doleschallia nacar nacar (Boisduval, 1832)
Doleschallia nacar trachelus Fruhstorfer, 1907
Doleschallia noorna fulva Joicey & Noakes, 1915
Doleschallia noorna noorna Grose-Smith & Kirby, 1893
Doleschallia rickardi Grose-Smith, 1890
Doleschallia tongana gurelca (Grose-Smith & Kirby, 1893)
Doleschallia tongana menexema (Fruhstorfer, 1912)
Euthaliopsis aetion rugei (Ribbe, 1898)
Euthaliopsis aetion sosisthenes Fruhstorfer, 1913
Euthaliopsis aetion thieli (Ribbe, 1898)
Hypolimnas alimena afra Fruhstorfer, 1903
Hypolimnas alimena bateia Fruhstorfer, 1915
Hypolimnas alimena curicta Fruhstorfer, 1912
Hypolimnas alimena diphridas Fruhstorfer, 1912
Hypolimnas alimena eremita Butler, 1883
Hypolimnas alimena eremitana Strand, 1914
Hypolimnas alimena inexpectata (Salvin & Godman, 1877)
Hypolimnas alimena kuramata (Ribbe, 1898)
Hypolimnas alimena obsolescens Fruhstorfer, 1903
Hypolimnas alimena saturnia Fruhstorfer, 1903
Hypolimnas antilope mela Fruhstorfer, 1903
Hypolimnas antilope shortlandica (Ribbe, 1898)
Hypolimnas antilope wagneri Clark, 1946
Hypolimnas bolina nerina (Fabricius, 1775)
Hypolimnas deois albosignata Talbot, 1932
Hypolimnas deois deois (Hewitson, 1858)
Hypolimnas deois divina Fruhstorfer, 1903
Hypolimnas deois paleutes (Grose-Smith, 1897)
Hypolimnas deois palladius (Grose-Smith, 1897)
Hypolimnas deois panopion Grose-Smith, 1894
Hypolimnas deois woodlarkiana Talbot, 1932
Hypolimnas euploeoides Rothschild, 1915
Hypolimnas misippus (Linnaeus, 1764)
Hypolimnas pithoeka fumosus Joicey & Noakes, 1915
Hypolimnas pithoeka gretheri Clark, 1946
Hypolimnas pithoeka pithoeka Kirsch, 1877
Hypolimnas pithoeka unicolor (Salvin & Godman, 1877)
Junonia erigone iona Grose-Smith, 1894
Junonia erigone leucophora Fruhstorfer, 1903
Junonia hedonia admiralitatis (Rothschild, 1915)
Junonia hedonia zelima (Fabricius, 1775)
Junonia orithya neopommerana Ribbe, 1898
Junonia orithya novaeguineae (Hagen, 1897)
Junonia villida villida (Fabricius, 1787)
Lexias aeropa hegias Fruhstorfer, 1913
Mynes anemone Vane-Wright, 1976
Mynes aroensis Ribbe, 1900
Mynes eucosmetos cottonis (Grose-Smith, 1894)
Mynes eucosmetos eucosmetos Godman & Salvin, 1879
Mynes geoffroyi aureodiscus Joicey & Noakes, 1915
Mynes geoffroyi geoffroyi (Guérin-Méneville, 1831)
Mynes geoffroyi turturilla Fruhstorfer, 1909
Mynes katharina Ribbe, 1898
Mynes websteri Grose-Smith, 1894
Mynes woodfordi woodfordi Godman & Salvin, 1888
Symbrenthia hippoclus armis Fruhstorfer, 1912
Symbrenthia hippoclus atta Fruhstorfer, 1904
Symbrenthia hippoclus hippoclus (Cramer, 1779)
Symbrenthia hylaeus Symbrenthia hylaeus hylaeus (Wallace, 1869)
Symbrenthia hylaeus Symbrenthia hylaeus nigroapicalis Joicey & Noakes, 1915
Yoma algina algina (Boisduval, 1832)
Yoma algina helisson Fruhstorfer, 1912
Yoma algina kokopona (Hagen, 1897)
Yoma algina manusi Rothschild, 1915
Yoma algina odilia Fruhstorfer, 1912
Yoma algina pavonia (Mathew, 1887)
Yoma algina vestina Fruhstorfer, 1912

Heliconiinae
Acraea andromacha oenone (Kirby, 1889)
Acraea meyeri Kirsch, 1877
Acraea moluccana fumigata (Honrath, 1886)
Acraea moluccana pella (Fruhstorfer, 1907)
Algia felderi (Kirsch, 1877)
Algiachroa woodfordi woodfordi (Godman & Salvin, 1888)
Argynnis hyperbius niugini (Samson, 1976)
Cethosia cydippe alkmene Fruhstorfer, 1902
Cethosia cydippe cenchrites Fruhstorfer, 1909
Cethosia cydippe cleanthis Fruhstorfer, 1902
Cethosia cydippe cyrene Wallace, 1869
Cethosia cydippe damasippe C. & R. Felder, 1867
Cethosia cydippe lucina Fruhstorfer, 1905
Cethosia cydippe schoutensis Joicey & Noakes, 1915
Cethosia cydippe woodlarkiana Fruhstorfer, 1902
Cethosia obscura antippe (Grose-Smith, 1889)
Cethosia obscura gabrielis (Rothschild, 1898)
Cethosia obscura hormisda Fruhstorfer, 1915
Cethosia obscura obscura Guérin-Méneville, 1831
Cethosia vasalia Muller, 1999
Cirrochroa imperatrix Grose-Smith, 1894
Cirrochroa regina ducalis Wallengren, 1869
Cirrochroa regina myra Fruhstorfer, 1907
Cirrochroa regina regina C. & R. Felder, 1865
Cupha crameri leonida Fruhstorfer, 1912
Cupha melichrysos tredecia (Mathew, 1887)
Cupha prosope alexis (Grose-Smith, 1898)
Cupha prosope charmides Grose-Smith, 1898
Cupha prosope cyclotas (Grose-Smith, 1894)
Cupha prosope fumosa (Grose-Smith, 1897)
Cupha prosope turneri (Butler, 1876)
Cupha prosope wallacei (Felder, 1867)
Phalanta alcippe arruanae (Felder, 1860)
Phalanta alcippe cervina (Butler, 1876)
Phalanta alcippe cervinides (Fruhstorfer, 1904)
Phalanta alcippe denosa (Fruhstorfer, 1912)
Phalanta alcippe ephyra (Godman & Salvin, 1888)
Terinos alurgis Godman & Salvin, 1880
Terinos maddelena Grose-Smith & Kirby, 1889
Terinos taxiles helleri Fruhstorfer, 1906
Terinos tethys tethys Hewitson, 1862
Terinos tethys udaios Fruhstorfer, 1906
Vagrans egista admiralia (Rothschild, 1915)
Vagrans egista bismarckensis (Talbot, 1932)
Vagrans egista pallida (Talbot, 1932)
Vagrans egista propinqua (Miskin, 1884)
Vagrans egista shortlandica (Fruhstorfer, 1912)
Vindula arsinoe ada (M.R. Butler, 1874)
Vindula arsinoe adina (Fruhstorfer, 1906)
Vindula arsinoe archeri Samson, 1982
Vindula arsinoe bosnikensis (Joicey & Noakes, 1915)
Vindula arsinoe insularis (Salvin & Godman, 1877)
Vindula arsinoe lemina (Ribbe, 1898)
Vindula arsinoe meforica (Fruhstorfer, 1906)
Vindula arsinoe meridionalis (Talbot, 1932)
Vindula arsinoe rookiana (Strand, 1914)
Vindula arsinoe sapor (Godman & Salvin, 1888)

References
W.John Tennent: A checklist of the butterflies of Melanesia, Micronesia, Polynesia and some adjacent areas. Zootaxa 1178: 1-209 (21 Apr. 2006) (checklist of species outside of mainland Papua New Guinea)
The Papua Insects Foundation (checklist of species of mainland Papua New Guinea)

Further reading
Rothschild, W., 1895. A Revision of the Papilios of the eastern Hemisphere, exclusive of Africa. Novitates Zoologicae II (3):167-463.  pdf
Parsons, M., 1999. The Butterflies of Papua New Guinea. Their systematics and biology. 736 pp., Academic Press, London.
Mastrigt, H. van & E. Rosariyanto, 2005. Buku Panduan Lapangan Kupu-kupu. Untuk Wilayah Mamberamo Sampai Pegunungan Cyclops [Field guide to the butterflies of the Birdshead Peninsula] 146 pp., Conservation International, Jakarta. 
Adalbert Seitz, 1927 Die Großschmetterlinge der Erde, Band 9: Abt. 2, Die exotischen Großschmetterlinge, Die indo-australischen Tagfalter, 1927, 1197 Seiten 177 Tafeln. Verlag Alfred Kernen, Stuttgart
J. L. Gressitt and J. J. H. Szent-Ivany, 1968  Bibliography of New Guinea entomology Pacific Insects Monograph 18: 1-674 pdf Full list of literature to that date.

Butterflies
Papua New Guinea
Papua New Guinea
Papua New Guinea